Academy Music Group (AMG) is a leading owner-operator of music venues in the United Kingdom. They operate a number of medium-sized venues, the majority of which (until January 2009) took the name Carling Academy after their sponsor Carling.  Some of these also contain smaller venues used for less well known acts; these typically take the title 'Academy 2'.

The group formed a partnership in 2008 with the O2 mobile phone company to allow customers of the company to receive priority access to tickets at the venues. The deal saw eleven UK venues renamed O2 Academies from 1 January 2009, with O2 customers able to buy tickets to gigs up to two days before others. The deal also involved music promoter Live Nation who own 51% of the venues. In July 2017, O2, Live Nation and Academy Music Group renewed the agreement for a further ten years.

Venues

Current

Former

References

External links
 

Music companies of the United Kingdom
Live Nation Entertainment